Charles Bramley (1870–1916) was an English footballer who played in the Football League for Notts County.

References

1870 births
1916 deaths
English footballers
Notts County F.C. players
Notts Rangers F.C. players
English Football League players
Association football midfielders
FA Cup Final players